Union of Journalists of Ukraine (ukr. Національна спілка журналістів України, НСЖУ) — a public organization uniting professional creative workers — journalists and other mass media workers who are professionally engaged in journalism and journalistic activities.

History
It was created in 1957 and officially recognized by a resolution of the Council of Ministers of the Ukrainian SSR. In the system of Soviet organizations, the Union of Journalists belonged (in contrast to the mass trade unions) to the group of so-called public creative unions; press workers were part of the culture workers' union. The Union of Journalists was headed by the republican board, the branches of the Union operated in the regions, and primary organizations operated in separate editorial offices of newspapers, radio and television. According to official data, the Journalists Union of the USSR had more than 7,000 members in Ukraine (1975), that is, less than half of all professional journalists working in the Ukrainian SSR. The Journalists Union operated under the constant supervision of the Department of Propaganda and Agitation of the Central Committee of the Communist Party of Ukraine, since journalists in the USSR were considered as "helpers of the party"; organizationally, Journalists Union was subordinated to the board in Moscow. Since 1964, Journalists Union has annually awarded Halan republican prizes, regional departments — prizes of local importance. Since January 1975, Journalists Union published the monthly newsletter (later magazine) "Journalist of Ukraine".

Since February 18, 1992, Journalists Union, in accordance with the decision of its board, has been functioning as an independent creative union of Ukraine. Members of the organization are issued certificates and a press card. By the resolution of the Cabinet of Ministers of Ukraine dated April 23, 1999, the Union was granted national status. As for 2017 Union of Journalists of Ukraine had 19000 members. Since 2017 the chair of the Union of Journalists of Ukraine is Seghii Tomilenko.

References

External links 

Official page
A statement of the heads of NUJU regional organizations

Ukrainian journalism organizations
1959 establishments in Ukraine
Journalism organizations
Institutions with the title of National in Ukraine